Ella Enchanted is a 2004 jukebox musical fantasy comedy film directed by Tommy O'Haver and written by Karen McCullah Lutz and Kirsten Smith, loosely based on Gail Carson Levine's 1997 novel of the same name. Starring Anne Hathaway and Hugh Dancy, the film plays with the usual fairy tale genre.

The film is a co-production between companies in the United States, Ireland, and the United Kingdom.

Plot
In the kingdom of Lamia, misguided fairy godmother Lucinda Perriweather bestows the “gift” of obedience on newborn Ella of Frell, causing her to instantly obey any command she is given. Some years later, on her deathbed, Ella's mother warns her daughter not to tell anyone about the gift, for fear that someone might use it to exploit Ella.

Years later, Ella's father Sir Peter marries wealthy socialite, Dame Olga, who dislikes Ella and treats her poorly. Ella meets Prince "Char" Charmont, who invites her to his coronation ball. Jealous, Olga’s daughters Hattie and Olive find out about Ella’s obedience and use it to humiliate her. Ella resolves to find Lucinda to undo her gift. Mandy, the household fairy, lends Ella her boyfriend, Benny, whom she accidentally transformed into a magic book. Ella learns that Lucinda is in Giantville and leaves to find her.

On her journey, Ella rescues Slannen, an elf who wants to be a lawyer rather than be forced to be an entertainer. They are captured by ogres but are rescued by Char. He joins them, intending to avenge the death of his father, and Ella opens his eyes to the cruelty of the laws oppressing elves and giants enacted by Char’s paternal uncle, the Regent Sir Edgar.

Ella and Char begin to fall in love. Edgar learns of Ella's gift from her stepsisters. Knowing his nephew is in love with her, Edgar orders Ella to murder Char at midnight and to keep this plan secret. Edgar reveals that he murdered Char's father, and the prince’s death will make Edgar king. Ella writes Char a letter, saying she must leave but cannot explain why. She has Slannen chain her to a tree, hoping to wait out Edgar's command, while Slannen recruits more elves and giants to protect Char.

Lucinda appears and Ella begs her to take back her gift. Offended, Lucinda insists that Ella remove the gift herself and unchains her. Forced back to the castle, Ella stumbles into the ball. Char whisks her away to a secret hall of mirrors, where he proposes. As Ella is about to stab Char, she sees her reflection and commands herself to no longer be obedient, permanently freeing herself from the gift. Char notices the dagger, and Edgar has Ella arrested before she can explain herself.

Benny reveals Ella is in the dungeon, and Slannen sneaks into the castle along with a band of elves, giants, and ogres, and frees her. Benny shows that Edgar has poisoned Char's crown, intending to kill him at the coronation. Ella and the others crash the ceremony and a brawl ensues. In the scuffle, Mandy manages to turn Benny human again. As Char and Ella fight off the guards, she confesses her love for him and reveals Edgar's plot. Edgar's talking snake, Heston, almost fatally bites Char, which Char takes as evidence of his uncle's guilt. Edgar attempts to proclaim himself king, but foolishly puts on the poisoned crown and collapses.

Soon after, Char and Ella are married, with Areida as Ella's maid of honor. Char toasts to a new era of equality among all citizens of the kingdom. Edgar is revealed to still be alive, but disabled. The cast performs a final dance number of "Don't Go Breaking My Heart" before the newlyweds ride off on their honeymoon.

Cast
 Anne Hathaway as Ella of Frell, a girl given the "gift" (or  curse) of obedience by the fairy Lucinda, which magically compels her to literally obey every command she is given, even if it is against her wishes.
Aimee Brigg as young Ella
 Hugh Dancy as Prince "Char" Charmont, son of the late king and heir to the throne. He is treated as a teen icon and has his own overzealous fan club, though he disagrees with this label.
 Cary Elwes as Sir Edgar, the Prince's evil uncle and King Regent who wants the crown for himself. He killed King Florian, and took over the crown years ago. 
 Steve Coogan as (the voice of) Heston, Edgar's pet snake and royal advisor.
 Eric Idle as the Narrator, our storyteller who speaks only in rhymes. 
 Aidan McArdle as Slannen, an elf who wants to become a lawyer. 
 Jimi Mistry as Benny, Mandy's boyfriend whom she had accidentally transformed into a giant magic book-(before the films events) and a pumpkin for a short time. He is later turned back into his human form towards the end of the film.
 Minnie Driver as Mandy, a household fairy who lives in Ella's home.
 Vivica A. Fox as Lucinda Perriweather, a well-meaning but misguided and often unhelpful fairy who gave the "gift" of obedience to Ella as a newborn infant.
 Lucy Punch as Hattie, one of Ella's cruel stepsisters who is obsessed with Prince Charmont.
 Jennifer Higham as Olive, Ella's kleptomaniac and dim-witted stepsister who always follows her older sister Hattie.
 Jim Carter as Nish, an ogre who eats humans and the leader of the pack of ogres. 
 Parminder Nagra as Areida, Ella's childhood best friend.
Ankita Malkan as young Areida
 Patrick Bergin as Sir Peter, Ella's father and Eleanor's husband.
 Donna Dent as Lady Eleanor, Ella's mother and Peter's first wife. 
 Joanna Lumley as Dame Olga, Ella's cruel abusive stepmother.
 Alvaro Lucchesi as Koopooduk, a giant 
 Heidi Klum as Brumhilda, a giantess by Slannen's love interest.

Production
Hathaway, who first read the book when she was 16, says that there was originally a version of the script that was much closer to the book but that it didn't work as a film; she added that she prefers the way the movie actually turned out because it "makes fun of itself for being a fairy tale." Levine states that the film is "so different from the book that it's hard to compare them," noting the addition of new characters such as Sir Edgar and Heston, and suggested "regarding the movie as a separate creative act".

Hathaway did her own singing in the film.

Jimi Mistry, a British actor of Indian descent, said that he enjoyed playing a talking book in the film because it offered him the opportunity to do something different from his other roles. "You can't get less Indian than a talking book, and an American talking book, so it was great," he said.

Filming took place in Ireland at Ardmore Studios and on location in Wicklow during August–December 2002. Locations included Luggala Estate, Killruddery House and Garden, and Kiltegan.

Release
Miramax Films released the film on April 9, 2004.

Box office
Ella Enchanted opened on April 9, 2004 and earned $6,169,030 in its opening weekend, ranking number nine at the domestic box office. At the end of its run, the film grossed $22,918,387 domestically and $4,470,380 overseas for a worldwide total of $27,388,767.

Critical response
The film received mixed reviews from critics. Review aggregator Rotten Tomatoes gives it a 51% approval rating based on 115 reviews with an average rating of 5.6/10. The site's consensus reads: "Hathaway is a charming heroine, but the simple storyline gets overwhelmed by silly gimmickry." On Metacritic, the film has a 53 out of 100 rating based on 30 critics, indicating "mixed or average reviews". Audiences polled by CinemaScore gave the film an average rating of "A-" on an A+ to F scale.

Chicago Sun-Times critic Roger Ebert gave the film 3.5 stars out of 4, praising it as "the best family film so far this year" (April 9, 2004).

Soundtrack

The soundtrack was released April 6, 2004 by Hollywood Records and features Kelly Clarkson's cover of Aretha Franklin's "Respect" along with "Somebody to Love" by Queen and "Don't Go Breaking My Heart" by Elton John and Kiki Dee, both as covered by Hathaway and Jesse McCartney.

References

External links
 
 
 
 

2004 films
2004 fantasy films
2004 romantic comedy films
2000s fantasy comedy films
2000s children's fantasy films
2000s romantic fantasy films
2000s teen comedy films
2000s teen fantasy films
2000s teen romance films
American children's fantasy films
American children's comedy films
American fantasy comedy films
American romantic comedy films
American romantic fantasy films
American teen comedy films
American teen romance films
British fantasy comedy films
British romantic comedy films
British romantic fantasy films
British teen comedy films
British teen romance films
2000s English-language films
English-language Irish films
Fairy tale parody films
Films about assassinations
Films about curses
Films about dysfunctional families
Films about elves
Films about fairies and sprites
Films about giants
Films about royalty
Films about unicorns
Films about weddings
Films based on American novels
Films based on Charles Perrault's Cinderella
Films based on children's books
Films based on multiple works
Films directed by Tommy O'Haver
Films scored by Nick Glennie-Smith
Films set in a fictional country
Films shot in County Wicklow
Irish fantasy comedy films
Irish romantic comedy films
Irish teen comedy films
Fiction about regicide
Films about magic
Miramax films
Monarchy in fiction
2000s American films
2000s British films